Rahul Ram is an Indian bass guitarist, social activist and music composer. He plays bass guitar for musical band Indian Ocean, which he joined in 1991. He is also one of the three members of 'Aisi Taisi Democracy,' along with Varun Grover (writer) and Sanjay Rajoura.

Biography

Rahul was born into a south Indian family, the son of noted botanist late Professor H.Y. Mohan Ram. He is a nephew of the late H. Y. Sharada Prasad, who was best known as the media adviser to Indira Gandhi.

Considering that he finally became a guitar player with a rock band, Rahul has some unexpected educational qualifications, earned at some of the top-ranking educational institutions in India and the USA. After schooling at St. Xavier's School, Delhi, he took a bachelor's degree in Chemistry at St. Stephen's College, Delhi and followed this up with an MSc degree in Chemistry from IIT Kanpur. Next, he took a PhD degree (1986–90) in Environmental Toxicology from Cornell University, which he attended on an Andrew White scholarship. His doctoral research on environmental toxicology is what moved him to become an activist with the Narmada Bachao Andolan (1990–95). His stint with that activist group consumed five years of his life immediately after he took his doctorate from Cornell.

Concurrently with his Narmada activism, Rahul had joined the Indian Ocean band in 1991, soon after returning to India with his doctorate. Later, he went to America to learn to play the Alto saxophone, which he intends to bring to the band's music. Inside his group, he is known as Logic Baba because of his rationality. He has composed music and done playback singing in Bollywood. Rahul, along with  Indian Ocean member Asheem Chakrabarty, sung the song 'Yaara Maula' in an Anurag Kashyap film Gulaal, a Hindi movie based on student politics. Rahul also created tribute videos for independent artists for ThankYouForMusic an event by Songdew.

Discography
Rahul Ram's band Indian Ocean has also given music for the following films:
SWARAJ—The Little Republic (2002)
Black Friday (2004)
Hulla (2008)
Live in Concert (DVD) (2008)
Beware Dogs(2008)
Bhoomi (2009)
Yeh Mera India (2009)
Gulaal (2009)
Mumbai Cutting (2009)
Leaving Home – The Life and Music of Indian Ocean (2010)
Peepli Live (2010)
Satyagraha (2013)
Katiyabaaz (Powerless, 2014), a documentary film
Masaan (2015)
Gulabo Sitabo (2020)

In 2015, Indian Ocean composed the music for critically acclaimed Masaan (2015), in which Rahul Ram collaborated with writer Varun Grover and Swanand Kirkire for two songs and an original composition Bhor. Rahul toured with Being Indian original series 'Aisi Taisi Democracy,' the coming together of three prolific talents -  stand-up comedian and social-satirist Sanjay Rajoura, stand-up comedian, writer and lyricist Varun Grover (writer) joined him.

Rahul also acted in A. R. Rahman's multi-lingual musical film 99 Songs.

References

External links
 Rahul Ram's Interview by Outlook India

Year of birth missing (living people)
Living people
Indian bass guitarists
Indian male composers
St. Stephen's College, Delhi alumni
IIT Kanpur alumni
Indian rock musicians
Cornell University alumni
Male bass guitarists
Male actors in Hindi cinema
Male actors in Telugu cinema